Chrematistics (from Greek: χρηματιστική), or the study of wealth or a particular theory of wealth as measured in money, has historically had varying levels of acceptability in Western culture.  This article will summarize historical trends.

Ancient Greece 

Aristotle established a difference between economics and chrematistics that would be foundational in medieval thought.  Chrematistics for Aristotle, was the accumulation of money for its own sake, especially by usury, an unnatural activity that dehumanizes those who practice it.  Economics for Aristotle is the natural use of money as a medium of exchange.  

According to Aristotle, the "necessary" economy is licit if the sale of goods is made directly between the producer and buyer at the right price; it does not generate a value-added product. By contrast, it is illicit if the producer purchases for resale to consumers for a higher price, generating added value. The money must be only a medium of exchange and measure of value. This system of direct sales only works when there are limited producers and consumers.

Middle Ages 
The Catholic Church maintained this economic doctrine throughout the Middle Ages.  Saint Thomas Aquinas accepted capital accumulation if it served for virtuous purposes as charity.

Modern 
Although Martin Luther raged against usury and extortion, modern sociologists have argued that he inspired doctrines that assisted in the spread of capitalistic practices in early modern Europe.  Max Weber argued that Protestant sects emphasized frugality, sobriety, deferred consumption, and saving.

In Karl Marx's Das Kapital, Marx developed a labor theory of value inspired by Aristotle's notions of exchange and highlighting the consequences of what he also calls auri sacra fames (damned thirst for gold), a Latin reference of Virgil to the passion of money for money itself.

Chrematistics theory in marketing 
From the marketing systems perspective, chrematistics refers to the process of manipulatively influencing marketing systems' structure, functions, and outcomes perpetuated by marketing system actors wielding required power, knowledge, and skills. To study chrematistics in marketing systems, researchers can employ the following macromarketing research methodology proposed by Kadirov et al. (2016): 

 frame a marketing system for analysis;
 collect rich data (both qualitative and quantitative) about the marketing system under focus; 
 analyse the following symptoms: community needs myopia, demand engineering, commercialisation, and the view of "success";
 analyse opportunity costs related to marketing systems design and collective norms;
 analyse rhetorical mechanisms at a societal level, and 
 study how institutional changes are transformed into revenue streams.

See also
Critique of political economy
Economic anthropology

References

Further reading
 Aktouf, O. (1989): “Corporate Culture, the Catholic Ethic, and the Spirit of Capitalism: A Quebec Experience”, in Journal of Standing Conference on Organizational Symbolism. Istanbul, pp. 43–80.
 Browdie, S.; Rowe, C. (2002): Aristotle's Nicomachean Ethics: Translation, Introduction, and Commentary. Oxford: Oxford University Press.
 Daly, H. and COBB, J. (1984): 'For the Common Good: Redirecting the Economy toward Community, the Environment, and a Sustainable Future'. Boston: Beacon Press.
 Gržan, Karel (2019): '95 Theses: Nailed to the Door of the Shrine of Neoliberal Capitalism to Achieve Liberation from Parasitic Chrematism'. Rok Zavrtanik, et al., Amazon.
 Kraut, R. (ed.) (2006): The Blackwell Guide to Aristotle’s Nicomachean Ethics. Oxford: Blackwell.
Kadirov, D., Varey, R. J., & Wolfenden, S. (2016). Investigating chrematistics in marketing systems: a research framework. Journal of Macromarketing, 36(1), 54-67.
McLellan, D. (ed.) (2008): Capital (Karl Marx): An Abridged Edition. Oxford: Oxford Paperbacks; Abridged edition.
 Pakaluk, M. (2005): Aristotle’s Nicomachean Ethics: An Introduction. Chicago: University of Chicago Press.
 Schefold, B. (2002): “Reflections on the Past and Current State of the History of Economic Thought in Germany”, in History of Political Economy 34, Annual Supplement, pp. 125–136.
 Shipside, S. (2009): Karl Marx's Das Kapital: A Modern-day Interpretation of a True Classic. Oxford: Infinite Ideas.
 Tanner, S.J. (2001): The Councils of the Church. A Short History. New York: The Crossroad Publishing Company.
 Warne, C. (2007): Aristotle's Nicomachean Ethics: Reader's Guide. London: Continuum.

Ethics
Schools of economic thought
Preclassical economics